Sukali is a town in Myawaddy Township, Myawaddy District, in the Kayin State of Myanmar.

References

External links
 " Sukali Map — Satellite Images of Sukali" at Maplandia

Populated places in Kayin State